Jizz or giss is the overall impression or appearance of a bird garnered from such features as shape, posture, flying style or other habitual movements, size and colouration combined with voice, habitat and location. The concept was popularised in birdwatching, but is so useful that it has since been adopted increasingly widely by field biologists in referring to the impression of the general characteristics of other animals. It similarly appears in such fields of observational biology as microscopy. Ecologists and botanists may speak of "habitat jizz" or the jizz of a plant.

Sean Dooley described jizz as "the indefinable quality of a particular species, the 'vibe' it gives off" and notes that although it is "dismissed by many as some kind of birding alchemy, there is some physical basis to the idea of jizz."

Experienced birders can often make reliable identifications in the field at a glance by using jizz. Often jizz is useful for identifying to the family or genus level, rather than the species level, as in: "It definitely had the jizz of a thrush, but I couldn't see what kind."

Etymology 

The term was first used in print in 1922, in Thomas Coward's "Country Diary" column for the Manchester Guardian of 6 December 1921; the piece was subsequently included in his 1922 book Bird Haunts and Nature Memories. He attributed it to "a west-coast Irishman", and explained:

Jeremy Greenwood concludes that the term was further popularised by its use by Miss E.I. Turner, "a popular author", in the journal Open Air in 1923.

There is a theory that it comes from the World War II RAF acronym GISS for "General Impression of Size and Shape (of an aircraft)", but the use of the term in 1922 precludes that. Other possibilities include the word gist, or a contraction of just is. These theories were debunked by Jeremy Greenwood and his brother Julian in 2018.

References

External links

Texas Park and Wildlife Department – Project Prairie Birds – JIZZ Descriptions and Alpha Codes for Selected Species
uk.rec.birdwtching FAQ – What is jizz and where does the word come from?
McDonald, D 1996, 'The etymology of jizz', Canberra Bird Notes, vol. 21, no. 1, pp. 2–11.

Birdwatching
Wild animals identification
1920s neologisms